Vasek Pospisil was the defending champion but lost in the first round to Emilio Nava.

Stefan Kozlov won the title after defeating Aleksandar Vukic 6–2, 6–3 in the final.

Seeds

Draw

Finals

Top half

Bottom half

References

External links
Main draw
Qualifying draw

Charlottesville Men's Pro Challenger - 1
2021 Singles